Dark Dear Heart is a studio album by Holly Cole. It was released in 1997 in Canada on Alert Records.

Track listing

 "I've Just Seen a Face" (John Lennon and Paul McCartney) – 3:28
 "Make It Go Away" (Davis, Harding) – 4:00
 "Onion Girl" (Harding, Hull) – 4:05
 "Dark, Dear Heart" (O'Hara) – 4:00
 "You Want More" (Crow, Trott) – 4:32
 "Timbuktu" (Davis, Jordan) – 3:50
 "World Seems to Come and Go" (Piltch, White) – 5:16
 "River" (Mitchell) – 4:44
 "Hold On" (Batteau, Cody, Klein) – 4:33
 "Brighter Lonely Day (Run, Run, Run)" (O'Hara) – 4:53
 "I Told Him That My Dog Wouldn't Run" (Larkin) – 4:21
 "All the Pretty Little Horses" (Traditional) – 4:29

Personnel 
 Holly Cole – vocals
 Larry Klein – organ, programming
 Jim Cox – keyboards
 Aaron Davis – keyboards
 Jon Hassell – trumpet
 Steve Tavaglione – soprano saxophone
 Kevin Breit – guitar, banjo, autoharp, loops, bazouki
 George Koller – bass
 Dean Parks – bass, guitar, electric guitar
 David Piltch – bass, guitar, mandolin
 Greg Leisz – pedal steel, electric guitar
 Helik Hadar – drums, programming, digital editing
 Iki Levy – drums, programming, loops
 Mark Kelso – drums, tambourine, vocals
 Alex Brown – background vocals
 Monalisa Young – background vocals

Production
 Larry Klein – producer
 Tom Berry – executive producer
 Leanne Ungar – engineer
 Tim Gerron – assistant engineer
 David Bryant – assistant engineer
 Denis Tougas – assistant engineer
 Greg Calbi – mastering
 Roger Moutenot – mixing

References

Holly Cole albums
1997 albums
Albums produced by Larry Klein
Alert Records albums